Princess Friederike of Schleswig-Holstein-Sonderburg-Glücksburg (9 October 1811 – 10 July 1902) was a daughter of Friedrich Wilhelm, Duke of Schleswig-Holstein-Sonderburg-Glücksburg and Princess Louise Caroline of Hesse-Kassel and an elder sister of Christian IX of Denmark. Friederike became the Duchess of Anhalt-Bernburg upon her marriage to Alexander Karl, Duke of Anhalt-Bernburg, the last Duke of Anhalt-Bernburg. She served as Regent of the Duchy from 1855 to 1863.

Early life

Friederike was born on 9 October 1811 at Gottorp Castle near Schleswig in the Duchy of Schleswig as Princess Friederike of Schleswig-Holstein-Sonderburg-Beck, the second-eldest daughter of Friedrich Wilhelm, Duke of Schleswig-Holstein-Sonderburg-Beck, and Princess Louise Caroline of Hesse-Kassel.

Friederike's father was the head of the ducal house of Schleswig-Holstein-Sonderburg-Beck, a junior male branch of the House of Oldenburg which had occupied the throne of Denmark since 1448. Through her father, Friederike was thus a direct male-line descendant of King Christian III of Denmark.

Friederike's mother was a daughter of Landgrave Charles of Hesse, a Danish Field Marshal and Royal Governor of the duchies of Schleswig and Holstein, and his wife Princess Louise of Denmark, a daughter of Frederick V of Denmark. On 6 June 1825, Duke Friedrich Wilhelm was appointed Duke of Glücksburg by his brother-in-law Frederick VI of Denmark, as the elder Glücksburg line had become extinct in 1779. He subsequently changed his title to Duke of Schleswig-Holstein-Sonderburg-Glücksburg and founded the younger Glücksburg line.

Duchess of Anhalt-Bernburg
Friederike married Alexander Karl, Duke of Anhalt-Bernburg, son of Alexis Friedrich Christian, Duke of Anhalt-Bernburg and Princess Marie Friederike of Hesse-Kassel, on 30 October 1834 at Schloss Louisenlund, near Schleswig. The union was childless.

By November 1855 the Duke was confined to Schloss Hoym due to a progressive mental illness (some sources state that he suffered from schizophrenia). There, Alexander Karl spend the rest of his life under medical care in the company of his chamberlain, the painter Wilhelm von Kügelgen. Due to his incapacity, Friederike acted as regent.

Later life
Alexander Karl died at Hoym on 19 August 1863 at age 58. Because the marriage produced no issue, the Duchy of Anhalt-Bernburg was inherited by his kinsman Leopold IV, Duke of Anhalt-Dessau-Köthen who merged the duchy with his own to form a united Duchy of Anhalt.

The Dowager Duchess Friederike died on 10 July 1902 at Alexisbad, Ballenstedt.

Ancestry

References

External links 

1811 births
1902 deaths
Friederike
Friederike
People from Schleswig, Schleswig-Holstein
Friederike
Burials at Schlosskirche St. Aegidien (Bernburg)
19th-century women rulers